The Liga 1 Putri (English: Women's League One), is the top-flight women's football league in Indonesia. Supervised by the PSSI, the league is participated by ten clubs, with each side fielding a team in the Liga 1 men's league. The league's inaugural season began on 5 October 2019.

History 
On 25 July 2019, during a general assembly meeting with all Liga 1 club representative in Jakarta, Acting Chairperson of PSSI Iwan Budianto announced the formation of the new Liga 1 Putri. From 2006, the Pertiwi Cup was Indonesia's top women's association football competition. However compared to the Liga 1 Putri, the Pertiwi Cup was contested by Indonesian provincial selection teams and not by clubs. The league was formed as a means to aid the selection of players for the Indonesian women's national team and so that the competition between boys and girls is balanced.

Ten teams out of 18 in 2019 Liga 1 teams announced their participation in the inaugural season of Liga 1 Putri: Persija, PSM, Persib, TIRA-Persikabo, Bali United, Arema, PSIS, Persipura, PSS, Persebaya.

Format 
There are 10 teams in the league, divided into two groups for the first round. In the first round, all groups play four-series home tournament with five matches for each series. The best two teams advance to semi-finals. Semi-finals and finals play home and away format.

Past winners

Performances

Awards

Top scorer

Best players

Best young players

Broadcasters 
In Indonesia, the league is currently broadcast by free-to-air public television network TVRI and Djarum Media's premium multi platform network Mola through 2022. For the first edition, Mola is broadcasting selected matches from opening series and TVRI from third series, the rights also includes four semi finals and both finals. Live matches on Nasional are also available for viewers outside Indonesia through TVRI website and TVRI Klik app.

See also

 AFC Women's Club Championship
 Liga 1

References

External links 
 

 
1
1
Indonesia
Sports leagues established in 2019
2019 establishments in Indonesia
Professional sports leagues in Indonesia